The Insperity Invitational is a professional golf tournament in Texas on the PGA Tour Champions. It debuted in 2004 as the Administaff Small Business Classic, and is played in suburban Houston. The first four editions were at Augusta Pines Golf Club in Spring, then it was moved to The Woodlands Country Club in The Woodlands in 2008, the former home of the Houston Open on the PGA Tour.

Played in October for its first eight years, it changed to early May in 2012. Insperity, previously known as Administaff, has been the event's main sponsor since its debut. The purse for 2018 is $2.2 million, with a winner's share of $330,000.

Winners

Notes

Multiple winners
One player has won this tournament more than once through 2021.
4 wins: Bernhard Langer (2007, 2008, 2014, 2018)

External links

Coverage on the PGA Tour Champions' official site

PGA Tour Champions events
Golf in Texas
Recurring sporting events established in 2004
2004 establishments in Texas